Events in the year 1808 in Art.

Events
May 2 and May 3 – In Spain the guerrilla resistance movement against the French forces of Napoleon Bonaparte begins; immortalized in 1814 by Francisco Goya's Third of May 1808.
April 5 – John James Audubon marries Lucy Bakewell. 
 The Academy of Fine Arts, Munich, is given the title of Royal Academy of Fine Arts by King Maximilian I Joseph of Bavaria.
 The Rijksmuseum moves from The Hague to Amsterdam, where it is located temporarily at the Royal Palace.
 Thomas Phillips is elected to the Royal Academy.

Works
 François Joseph Bosio – Statue of Cupid with a bow (Hermitage Museum)
 Antonio Canova – Venus Victrix (marble reclining nude)
 Richard Cosway – Portrait miniature of Arthur Wellesley
 François-Xavier Fabre – The Judgement of Paris (approximate date)
 Anne-Louis Girodet de Roussy-Trioson
 The Entombment of Atala
 François-René de Chateaubriand
 Hortense de Beauharnais
 Francisco Goya – Prison Interior
 Antoine-Jean Gros – Napoléon on the Battlefield of Eylau
 Jean Auguste Dominique Ingres
 The Bather
 Oedipus explains the riddle of the Sphinx
 Thomas Lawrence – Portrait of the Children of Ayscoghe Boucherett
 Edouard Pingret – Portrait of Napoleon I of France

Publications
Johann Dominicus Fiorillo – .
Robert Blair – The Grave, with illustrations from designs by William Blake (including A Vision of the Last Judgment).
Augustus Charles Pugin & Thomas Rowlandson – Volume 1 of The Microcosm of London, illustrated in aquatint from watercolours produced jointly by Pugin & Rowlandson and published by Rudolph Ackermann in London.

Births
February 5  – Carl Spitzweg, German Biedermeier painter (died 1885)
February 26 – Honoré Daumier, French painter, sculptor and illustrator (died 1879)
March 6 – Sofia Adlersparre, Swedish painter (died 1862)
July 12 – Edward Troye, Swiss-born American equine painter (died 1874)
December 14 – Édouard De Bièfve, Belgian painter (died 1882)
 Date unknown – Nikola Aleksić, Serbian portraitist in the Biedermeier artistic tradition and the Nazarene movement of 19th century German painters (died 1873)

Deaths
February 10 – Hugh Douglas Hamilton, Irish portrait artist (born 1740)
March 1 – Fredrika Eleonora von Düben, Swedish textile artist, member of the Royal Swedish Academy of Arts (born 1738)
March 3 – Anton von Maron, Austrian painter active in Rome (born 1733)
April 10 – Jean-Laurent Mosnier, French painter and miniaturist (born 1743)
April 15 – Hubert Robert, French painter (born 1733)
April 26 – Jean-Baptiste Pillement, French Rococo painter, designer and engraver (born 1728)
June 1 – Jacques Kuyper, Dutch printmaker, painter, draftsman, watercolourist, etcher, musician, and composer (born 1761)
June 6 – Magdalene Bärens, Danish still life and flower painter (born 1737)
December 4 – Karl Ludwig Fernow, German art critic (born 1763)
December 18 – Christina Chalon, Dutch painter and etcher (born 1748)
 date unknown – Samuel Shelley, English miniaturist and watercolour painter (born 1750)

References

 
Years of the 19th century in art
1800s in art